The Iceland Triangular Tournament was an international football tournament in 1986. All matches were played in Laugardalsvöllur, Reykjavík. The three teams competing were the Republic of Ireland, Iceland and Czechoslovakia. 

The Republic of Ireland won the competition, the first time that country won an international football tournament. It was notable as the beginning of the success that came under Jack Charlton's management; it was here that he trialled his famous tactics of pressuring opposition defenders in the hope of forcing mistakes. David O'Leary refused to play, instead going on a family holiday, which led to his being dropped from the international team for a time, Mick McCarthy taking his place at centre half. Ray Houghton, John Aldridge and Pat Bonner also established themselves in the Irish team after playing in Iceland. It featured the only international appearances by Mick Kennedy.

Results

Table

References

External links
Iceland Triangular Tournament at RSSSF

1986
1985–86 in European football
1985–86 in Republic of Ireland association football
Triangular
1985–86 in Czechoslovak football